Diemenipatus taiti is a species of viviparous velvet worm in the family Peripatopsidae. This species has 15 pairs of legs in both sexes. The type locality is in Tasmania.

References 

Onychophorans of Australasia
Onychophoran species
Animals described in 2018